The Seven Faces of Jane is a 2022 American anthology film. The film originates from directors Gillian Jacobs, Ken Jeong, Gia Coppola, Ryan Heffington, Alexandra Cassavetes, Boma Iluma, Julian Acosta, and Alex Takacs. It consists of eight short films, all starring Jacobs as the title character.

The film premiered at the 2022 Bentonville Film Festival on June 22, 2022. It will be released in select theaters and on video on demand on January 13, 2023.

Premise
The anthology film follows Jane, who tumbles through a gauntlet of surreal, beautiful, and heartbreaking adventures, each one more unexpected than the last. While dropping off her daughter at a summer camp for the first time, she encourages her reticent child to engage in new experiences. Jane finds herself heeding her own advice.

Cast
 Gillian Jacobs as Jane
 Emanuela Postacchini as Valentina
 Anthony Skordi as Pinky
 Leticia LaBelle as Mom
 Benjamin Hjelm as Cemetery John
 Chido Nwokocha as Tayo
 Sybil Azur
 Daniela Hernandez
 Joel McHale
 Caroline Ducrocq
 Breeda Wool
 Soledad St. Hilaire
 Joni Reiss

Production
Principal photography on the film began on August 25, 2021, during the COVID-19 pandemic. Filming concluded on September 8, 2021, over 15 days.

References

External links
 

2022 films
American anthology films
2020s English-language films
Films impacted by the COVID-19 pandemic